The Limb Brook is a stream in Sheffield, South Yorkshire, England. It rises at the village of Ringinglow, flowing east through Whirlow and Ecclesall Woods into Abbeydale in the Beauchief area, where it merges with the River Sheaf. Near this point part of the stream has been diverted to provide the goit for the Abbeydale Industrial Hamlet millpond, and this channel flows through what is now Beauchief Gardens.

History 
On nearby Fulwood Lane a polished Neolithic stone axehead was found in 1952 indicating ancient human activity in the area.

An interim report by University of Sheffield staff on excavations of a linear feature at Sheephill Farm, close to the brook has suggested evidence of the route of the lost Roman Road linking Templeborough with the Roman Signal Station at Navio and Batham Gate. The feature, which extends through Barber Fields is 20m wide and filled to a depth of 5m with rubble and has a metalled surface. The route of the Roman Road would have passed close to the Roman Villa known to have existed at nearby Whirlow Hall Farm.

Limb Brook lies entirely within the City of Sheffield boundaries, but forms (with the connecting River Sheaf and Meers Brook) part of the historic border between Yorkshire and Derbyshire. This boundary dates back to the Anglo-Saxon kingdoms of Mercia and Northumbria. Sidney Oldall Addy, in his 1888 book on the Sheffield dialect mentions that this stream is called Fenny Brook on the Ordnance Survey map, where it flows past Ringinglow.

The brook has long been used as a source of power for local industry; remains of water-powered mills used variously for smelting lead and grinding corn can be seen at Whirlow Wheel and Ryecroft Mill in Ecclesall Woods.

Historical evidence of shallow coal drift-mining of the Ringinglow seam which lies on top of the Chatsworth Grit has been found in the Barber Fields area. The workings extended beneath the watercourse. Stratigraphically this was the lowest coal seam ever worked in the Sheffield area. The mine was served by a short railway which, along with the mine is no more. All that remains is a spoil-heap on the North bank of the brook. The mine is one of the few known examples of a shallow drift to have been worked by a small number of men in the Sheffield area.

Close to the drift-mine was a copperas works. This was disused by 1877.

Today, the brook no longer supports any industry, but with the woodlands of the Limb valley provides a valuable recreational resource for the inhabitants of Sheffield. It is owned and administered by the city council's recreation department, who maintain the area for the benefit of wildlife and the public. Sheffield Round Walk follows almost the entire route of the Limb brook, from Abbeydale Road South to Ringinglow.

Flora and fauna 
Limb Brook rises in a sphagnum moss bog by the side of Ringinglow Road and then flows through Lady Canning's Plantation, a coniferous woodland, managed by Sheffield City Council Parks and Countryside Service. It then flows slowly through farmland, where it provides an environment for reeds and sedges. As it descends into the Limb valley and down through Ecclesall Woods, it is surrounded by steep hillsides which support mature woodland, including Beech, Sycamore, Alder, Ash and Hazel. This is a rich environment for invertebrates and many birds and mammals, including kingfishers and water voles. The rare white-clawed crayfish has also been seen.

References

External links 
The Sheffield Round Walk - Sheffield City Council
Limb Valley Nature Trail Introduction 1995, A. H. V. Smith (ed), published by The Sorby Record

Rivers of Sheffield